"Chocolate with Nuts" is the first half of the twelfth episode of the third season and the 51st overall episode of the American animated television series SpongeBob SquarePants. It was written by the storyboard directors, Paul Tibbitt and Kaz, alongside Kent Osborne and Merriwether Williams with Andrew Overtoom as animation director and Carson Kugler, William Reiss and Mike Roth serving as storyboard artists. The segment was copyrighted in 2002 and aired on Nickelodeon in the United States on June 1 of that year. In this episode, SpongeBob and Patrick become entrepreneurs in an attempt to live a fancy life.

Plot
SpongeBob accidentally receives Squidward's Fancy Living Digest magazine in the mail, inspiring him and Patrick Star to become entrepreneurs. At Patrick's suggestion, the pair become door-to-door chocolate bar salesmen. Their first customer maniacally screams "chocolate" at the pair and chases after them. Successive attempts to sell also end in failure; SpongeBob and Patrick attempt to sell chocolate to another fish, who cons them into buying chocolate-carrying bags, while another loses patience with the duo after SpongeBob fails to provide a bar, which got lost in all the bags.

After initially disastrous results, the two try changing tactics by "being nice". However, this is unsuccessful, ending in Patrick buying pictures of a customer as an overweight child, as is their attempt to "focus", causing Patrick to creep out a potential customer. They decide that the only way to sell chocolate is to "stretch the truth", which is successful when they convince a very old woman and her daughter Mary that it "makes you live forever". The lying continues, but they lose their profit after attempting to help a seriously injured man, who turns out to be the same con artist from before, by buying his chocolate. However, their maniacal first customer catches up to them and he buys all of the chocolate that SpongeBob and Patrick have. They use the money to rent out a fancy restaurant, allowing access only to themselves and their dates: Mary and her mother.

Production
"Chocolate with Nuts" was written by Paul Tibbitt, Kaz, Kent Osborne and Merriwether Williams, with Andrew Overtoom serving as animation director. Tibbitt and Kaz also functioned as storyboard directors, and Carson Kugler, William Reiss and Mike Roth worked as storyboard artists. The episode originally aired on Nickelodeon in the United States on June 1, 2002, with a TV-Y parental rating.

"Chocolate with Nuts" was the last episode Kaz and Paul Tibbitt had written together since "Nasty Patty".

"Chocolate with Nuts" was released on the DVD compilation called SpongeBob SquarePants: Christmas on September 30, 2003. The episode was also included in the SpongeBob SquarePants: The Complete 3rd Season DVD on September 27, 2005. On September 22, 2009, "Chocolate with Nuts" was released on the SpongeBob SquarePants: The First 100 Episodes DVD, alongside all the episodes of seasons one through five.

Reception
"Chocolate with Nuts" has received acclaim from both critics and fans alike and is often cited as one of the show's best episodes. Jordan Moreau, Katcy Stephan and David Viramontes of Variety ranked "Chocolate with Nuts" as the fourth best SpongeBob SquarePants episode. Emily Estep of "WeGotThisCovered.com" rated the episode as the tenth best episode of the show, saying "The reason 'Chocolate with Nuts' is such a good episode is that it subtly and somewhat darkly hints at the concept of just how crazy the people who live around you are. SpongeBob and Patrick are mostly swindled into buying things from other people – actually, a single con man who keeps appearing – and nothing is more terrifying/hilarious than the man who simply starts screaming 'chocolate' repeatedly until SpongeBob and Patrick run away. 'Chocolate with Nuts' adds the complete absurdity of the program – like the old lady and her even older mother who remembers when 'they first invented chocolate. Sweet, sweet chocolate. I always hated it!' – and the aspects of SpongeBob's undersea life that mirror our own lives on land – like stranger danger."

Nancy Basile of About.com ranked the episode  5 on her "Best SpongeBob SquarePants Episodes" list. She said "I can relate to the customer who spends this entire episode running around Bikini Bottom, screaming for chocolate. 'Chocolate with Nuts' is about Patrick and SpongeBob trying to get rich by selling chocolate bars door to door ... There are witty punchlines and silly sight gags throughout the episode." Her favorite scene was when "Patrick focuses a little too hard on their unsuspecting customer."

SpongeBob's voice actor Tom Kenny considers this one of his favorite episodes. It was included in the iTunes collection "SpongeBob SquarePants: Tom Kenny's Top 20", where he called it "a very sick episode. You can spend hours theorizing about what these eleven minutes says  about truth, lies, Big Business, entrepreneurship, and consumerism."

References

External links

SpongeBob SquarePants episodes
2002 American television episodes
Film and television memes